The Bottler (died 1908) was the pseudonym of an Egyptian-born American gambler and underworld figure in New York. He ran a highly popular stuss parlor in the Five Points district during the early 20th century, one which was considered the most successful in the East Side, until his death when he confronted Kid Twist and the Eastman Gang from taking over his gambling establishment. It was his death, according to gangland lore, that resulted in the murder of Kid Twist and his bodyguard Cyclone Louie by Louie the Lump in 1908.

Biography
Little is known of his life prior to his arrival in New York, except only that he was of Egyptian origin, and was described as "round, inoffensive, well-dressed and affable". He soon gained a reputation as a "money maker" in the underworld, specifically for his clever methods for cheating, and began building up a successful illegal gambling empire based around his Glonconda stuss parlor on Suffolk Street. The Bottler's success soon attracted Kid Twist, then leader of the Eastman Gang, who took advantage of The Bottler's affiliation with the rival Five Points Gang and sought to take over his operation by forcing The Bottler to take on Kid Dahl as his partner. Unsure that the Five Pointers could protect him, especially in the midst of their gang war with the Eastmans, The Bottler was forced to agree to Kid Twist's terms. He and Kid Dahl split the profits equally for six weeks until Kid Dahl brought in The Nailer and ordered The Bottler to leave. Although he considered going to the police, The Bottler decided against it and instead barred his doors to Dahl and sent word to the Five Pointers in preparation to make a stand against the Eastmans.

At this time, a police detective from Central Office was tracking down a lush worker when he stumbled upon the scene between the desperate gambler and Kid Dahl both brandishing firearms at each other. The detective managed to relieve both men of their weapons and took them into custody whereupon he marched them both to the local police precinct where the two were charged with disturbance of the peace. Both were tried and Kid Dahl, who repeatedly threatened the life of The Bottler, was fined $5 and released. It was soon after this incident that Kid Dahl allegedly began planning the murder of The Bottler. A few days later, while The Bottler was at his place, a stranger entered the stuss parlor, shot him in the chest twice and left. Despite there being at least twenty people in the room at the time of the shooting, the resort was empty by the time police arrived. Both shots had struck The Bottler's heart and he had died at the scene. An inquest was held, however with Kid Twist being at the Delancy station house arguing over the release of an Eastman member and Kid Dahl seen arguing with the owner of a Houston Street restaurant, both men were released due to lack of evidence. Some time after that, a young member of the Five Points Gang known as Louie the Lump ambushed Kid Twist and his bodyguard Cyclone Louie at a Coney Island dance hall and gunned down the two men. The argument had been over a showgirl, Carroll Terry, however it was widely speculated that this had been the Five Pointers retribution for The Bottler's murder.

The Bottler was portrayed in the 1999 historical novel Dreamland by Kevin Baker.

References

Further reading
Pilat, Oliver and Jo Ranson. Sodom by the Sea: An Affectionate History of Coney Island. Garden City, New York: Doubleday, Doran & Co., 1941.

Year of birth missing
1908 deaths
Criminals from New York City
Egyptian emigrants to the United States